Mimoniphona fasciculata is a species of beetle in the family Cerambycidae, and the only species in the genus Mimoniphona. It was described by Stephan von Breuning in 1940.

References

Pteropliini
Beetles described in 1940